The Marian Conspiracy is a Big Finish Productions audio drama based on the long-running British science fiction television series Doctor Who.

Plot
The Sixth Doctor meets Evelyn Smythe and attempts to find out why she is disappearing by travelling back in time to the era of Queen Mary.

This episode addresses issues of freedom of religious expression.

Cast
The Doctor — Colin Baker
Evelyn Smythe — Maggie Stables
George Crow — Sean Jackson
John Wilson — Gary Russell
William Leaf — Jez Fielder
Lady Sarah — Jo Castleton
The Queen — Anah Ruddin
Reverend Thomas — Nicholas Pegg
François de Noailles — Barnaby Edwards
Royal Guard — Alistair Lock

Continuity
 This story features the first appearance of the first made-for-Big Finish companion, Evelyn.  How she parted company with the Doctor is revealed in Thicker Than Water.
 The Doctor mentions being in the Tower of London in The Mind of Evil.  The Sixth Doctor and Evelyn return to it in Jubilee.

External links
Big Finish Productions – The Marian Conspiracy

Sixth Doctor audio plays
2000 audio plays
Tudor England in popular culture